Jorge Fernando Seré Dulcini (born 9 July 1961) is a retired Uruguayan footballer who played as a goalkeeper.

Club career
Seré won several titles with Nacional, including the 1988 Intercontinental Cup where he saved four penalties as Nacional defeated PSV Eindhoven.

International career
Seré made 10 appearances for the senior Uruguay national football team from 1987 to 1989. He also played in the 1987 and 1989 Copa América.

Honours
Copa Libertadores: 1988
Intercontinental Cup: 1988
Recopa Sudamericana: 1989
Copa Interamericana: 1989
Primera División Uruguaya: 1992

References

1961 births
Living people
Uruguayan footballers
Uruguay international footballers
1987 Copa América players
1989 Copa América players
Copa América-winning players
Copa Libertadores-winning players
Uruguayan Primera División players
Danubio F.C. players
Club Nacional de Football players
Rampla Juniors players
Liverpool F.C. (Montevideo) players
Coritiba Foot Ball Club players
Uruguayan expatriate footballers
Expatriate footballers in Brazil
Footballers from Montevideo
Association football goalkeepers